Willie Lee Thrower (March 22, 1930 – February 20, 2002) was an American football quarterback. Born near Pittsburgh in New Kensington, Pennsylvania, Thrower was known as "Mitts" because of his large hands and arm strength, which stood in contrast to his 5' 11" frame. He was known to toss a football 70 yards. Thrower was a part of the 1952 Michigan State Spartans who won the national championship. He became one of the first National Football League (NFL) African American quarterbacks in the modern era, playing for the Chicago Bears in 1953.

Early life
Thrower played halfback in the single-wing formation for New Kensington High (present-name: Valley High School) as a freshman just after the end of World War II in 1945. Single wing halfbacks received a direct center snap, and then had run, handoff, or pass options. The team lost 2 games. In subsequent seasons head coach Don Fletcher installed the T formation and moved Thrower to quarterback.
From his sophomore to senior years, New Kensington won 24 straight games, including the 1946 and 1947 Western Pennsylvania Interscholastic Athletic League (WPIAL) Class AA championships. He would only lose one game in his career. As a dual-threat quarterback, Thrower was also an All-WPIAL and all-state first team honors, and he was named captain for an All-American scholastic selection covering the nation east of the Mississippi River. His final high school record was 35–3–1.

Despite his accomplishments, Thrower still experienced racism. In 1947, the Miami, Florida Peanut Bowl, featuring top high school teams around the country, rescinded the invitation it had extended to Ken High to play in the annual prep classic game when organizers saw a photograph of its star. In addition, many colleges opted not to extend Thrower a scholarship when they discovered his ethnicity.

College football

After graduating, Thrower chose to play collegiate football for the Michigan State Spartans alongside some of his high school teammates William Horrell, Joseph Klein, Renaldo Kozikowski, Vincent Pisano, and the Tamburo brothers, Harry and Richard. He would remain in East Lansing from 1949–1952, competing for playing time at quarterback with All-Americans Al Dorow and Tom Yewcic. Under head coach Clarence "Biggie" Munn Thrower became the first black quarterback to play in the Big Ten Conference in 1950 in his first year of varsity eligibility (NCAA rules dictated no freshman on varsity preventing Thrower, who was a freshman in 1949, to play) although during the first two years of his varsity career, he had only attempted 14 passes.

During the 1952 championship season, Thrower was an integral part of the title run, completing 59 percent of his passes (29-of-43) for 400 yards and five touchdowns. In a crucial game with Notre Dame, Thrower stepped in for an injured Tom Yewcic and threw a touchdown in a 21–3 win. In his final game in a Spartan uniform, Thrower completed seven of his 11 attempts for 71 yards and a touchdown, and added a rushing touchdown in a dominating 62–13 win over Marquette that sealed the nation's Number 1 ranking, and championship, for Michigan State.

Professional career

National Football League (1953)

Although Thrower was not drafted in 1953, he was offered one year, $8,500 contract with the Chicago Bears. He became the backup quarterback and roommate to future Pro Football Hall of Famer George Blanda.

He did not play until October 18, 1953 against the San Francisco 49ers. Bears coach George Halas was unhappy with Blanda's play and pulled him, sending in Thrower. He moved the team to the 15-yard line of the 49ers, but was denied a chance to score a TD when Halas put Blanda back into the game. The Bears eventually lost the game 35–28. Thrower completed 3 out of 8 passes for 27 yards, and had one interception. He would only play one more game for the Bears, who released Thrower after the 1953 season.

Legacy
In 1979, he was elected to the Westmoreland County Sports Hall of Fame. In 1981, he was inducted into AK Valley Hall of Fame. In 2003, an official state marker was dedicated to him in his high school. In 2011, he was inducted into the WPIAL Hall of Fame.
Being the first African-American quarterback in the NFL, in 2002 Thrower told The Valley News Dispatch of Tarentum, Pa, "I look at it like this: I was like the Jackie Robinson of football. A black quarterback was unheard of before I hit the pros."

Death
He died of a heart attack in New Kensington on February 20, 2002, at the age of 71. His funeral was held at the Mount Calvary Missionary Baptist Church in New Kensington, where 150 people mourned.

In 2006, a statue of Thrower was erected near Valley High School in New Kensington to honor his accomplishments. The statue was unveiled during a Valley High School football game in September attended by Pittsburgh Steelers owner Dan Rooney as well as Thrower's family. Willie Thrower was also mentioned by former NFL quarterback Warren Moon in his Pro Football Hall of Fame acceptance speech. Moon thanked Thrower, among others, for giving him inspiration during a time when few African-Americans played the quarterback position in the NFL.

See also

 Racial issues faced by black quarterbacks

References

External links
 THE COFFIN CORNER: Vol. 8, No. 3 (1986): WILLIE THROWER: The First Black QB in the NFL  by Robert B. Van Atta
 Willie Thrower Historical Marker
 Statue to be unveiled tonight by Tom Yerace
 Trail blazer: Willie 'The Pro' Thrower opened door for black quarterbacks by Chuck Finder.
 Willie Thrower: Breaking Barriers
 

1930 births
2002 deaths
American football quarterbacks
Chicago Bears players
Michigan State Spartans football players
Drinking establishment owners
People from New Kensington, Pennsylvania
Players of American football from Pennsylvania
African-American players of American football
20th-century African-American sportspeople
21st-century African-American people